, known as  for short, is a 2015 Japanese anime television series created by Diomedéa, based on the game of the same name by Kadokawa Games. The series was announced in September 2013, and aired from January to March 2015. An animated film, titled , was released on November 26, 2016. A second installment titled  by ENGI premiered in November 2022.

Plot
The kanmusu live together at a naval base, where they spend their everyday lives as they begin training for battle.

Plot (season 1)
The series features the destroyer Fubuki as the main character, with the storyline based on her point of view. Fubuki arrives at the naval base, where she meets other girls that she will eventually fight alongside. Despite lacking adequate combat training, she is recommended into the Third Torpedo Squadron by the admiral, and quickly finds herself sortied into battle. Upon being rescued by Akagi in a dangerous situation, Fubuki strives to do her best in order to train, with the hopes of eventually being able to fight alongside Akagi.

Characters

Characters (season 1)

Destroyers (season 1)

Meek and timid, at the beginning of the series she has no combat experience prior to transferring to the base, and performs poorly at physical activity. She is assigned temporarily to the  during the Battle of Southwest Area, before being transferred to the  during Operation MO and Operation FS, where she earns the respect of her peers, who choose her as their Flagship. Having a deep admiration for Akagi, she dreams of eventually becoming her escort, eventually doing so following her first remodel.

One of the members of the Third Torpedo Squadron. The first kanmusu Fubuki meets on the base, Mutsuki has a cheerful and responsible personality.

Another destroyer of the Third Torpedo Squadron, alongside Fubuki and Mutsuki, who has a laid back attitude. She has a verbal tic as she speaks, often inserting "poi" into her sentences.

Another destroyer who is instead assigned to the  during the Battle of W island. She has a mature personality, even more mature than her older sister Mutsuki. She is sunk during the Battle of W island.

, 

Two destroyers whom Fubuki and Mutsuki met during the briefing session of the W Island raid. Mochizuki is quite a sleepyhead, while Yayoi is rather emotionless. Both are later assigned to the Fourth Torpedo Squadron during the Battle of W island.

Akatsuki considers herself an adult lady, while Hibiki tends to speak Russian frequently, rarely saying anything but "хорошо" (Khorosho, "Very well" in Russian), Ikazuchi has a very caring and confident personality, and Inazuma is a timid girl. Akatsuki and Ikazuchi do not get along very well, as they constantly argue about whatever went wrong, such as Inazuma using a flamethrower to boil their curry faster only to end up burning the entire pot, making Inazuma cry and blame herself for the failure.

A destroyer who claims herself to be the fastest in the whole fleet, and indeed is. She is assigned to the Southwest Area Fleet during the Battle of Southwest Area. She has a hyperactive personality and tends to jump around rooms like a rabbit while waiting, to the point of forgetting what her next mission is.

Aircraft carriers (season 1)

Akagi engages enemy ships by firing arrows with her bow, which transform into aircraft piloted by fairies. Due to her past combat history, she is held in high esteem throughout the base. Her massive appetite is only outdone by Yamato-class battleships.

An aircraft carrier of the First Carrier Division and assigned to the First Carrier Task Force during the Battle of the Sea in Front of the Naval Base, who frequently accompanies Akagi. She especially refuses to follow orders from Zuikaku, considering the girl's command to be misguided, but will praise them as hard working girls. She appears distant but seems to have a soft spot for Akagi. She is later assigned to the Fifth Mobile Fleet during Operation MO and Operation FS.

, 

Two aircraft carriers of the Second Carrier Division assigned to the First Carrier Task Force during the Battle of the Sea in Front of the Naval Base.

An aircraft carrier of the Fifth Carrier Division and assigned to the Fourth Fleet during the Battle of the Sea in Front of the Naval Base. She advised her sister Zuikaku to avoid arguing with the experienced Kaga, but she seems to have satirized Kaga and the First Carrier Division potentially as escorts.

Another aircraft carrier of the Fifth Carrier Division assigned to the Fifth Mobile Fleet during Operation MO and Operation FS. Just like Kaga who dislikes the Fifth Carrier Division, Zuikaku also dislikes the First Carrier Division, although Fubuki later helps Zuikaku ease her relationship with Kaga.

An aircraft carrier who was last seen as an observer of Operation MI, though she appears as an obscure silhouette. She finally made her full appearance in the last phase of Operation MI as a reinforcement, finishing off the remaining Abyssal ships. Unlike the other carriers, she uses a repeating crossbow to launch her planes.

Light aircraft carriers (season 1)

A light aircraft carrier of another naval base.
, 

Two seaplane carriers briefly appearing in a reconnaissance before Operation MI.

Battleships/Battlecruisers (season 1)

These four battlecruisers are assigned to the Second Support Fleet (Kongō and Hiei) and the Fourth Fleet (Haruna and Kirishima) during the Battle of the Sea in Front of the Naval Base.
These four kanmusu have different personalities, but are all generally airheaded and excitable, to Mutsu's amusement and Fubuki's chagrin. Kongō is cheerful and has a habit of mixing English words into her speech, reflecting the fact that the ship whose spirit she represents was built in Britain. Hiei has an elder sister complex towards Kongō, right down to being jealous whenever she is ignored. Haruna is humble and speaks in third person, while Kirishima has a habit of testing microphones.
During Operation MO and Operation FS Kongō is transferred to the Fifth Mobile Fleet, where she operates separate from her sister ships.

, 

Two battleships who take on a command role from within the communications room of the naval base, relaying orders from the admiral to the fleets. Nagato does most of the commanding, while Mutsu acts as an assistant. Nagato is the serious and no-nonsense voice of authority but has a soft spot for cute animals and acts gruff to conceal her softer side, while Mutsu is more demure and seductive.

The most powerful battleship ever built, she is the navy's trump card and her existence has been kept a secret. She runs a forward base in Truk Lagoon during Operation FS. However, due to her need for large quantities of food and supplies, she has limited experience at sea. Historically, her living conditions were luxurious hence her nickname "Hotel Yamato", a moniker she dislikes.

Heavy cruisers (season 1)

A heavy cruiser who works as a teacher at the naval base's school. She is very strict for a teacher in that she even punished Yūdachi by giving the latter more homework after school, staying true to her nickname of "The Hungry Wolf". She is also considered a failure at getting dates with men.

, 

Two heavy cruisers who, like Ashigara, also work as teachers at the naval base's school. Nachi has a serious personality, while Haguro is a timid girl.

Another heavy cruiser whom Fubuki met when preparing for the raid on W Island. Her personality mirrors Atago, in that she is the more responsible of the two.

A heavy cruiser assigned to the Fourth Fleet during the Battle of the Sea in Front of the Naval Base, whom Fubuki ran into while the latter was searching for Akagi in the dorm's hot springs. However, due to a misunderstanding, she let Fubuki dock in the hot springs, thinking that the latter is severely damaged.

An aviation cruiser assigned to the Second Support Fleet during the Battle of the Sea in Front of the Naval Base and later the Fourth Fleet during Operation FS along with Mutsuki.

, 

Two heavy cruisers who, like the Myōkō sisters, work as teachers at the naval base's school. Tone teaches running in the destroyer class, and both she and Chikuma supervise Fubuki's training.

, 

Two heavy cruisers set to appear in the upcoming movie. They have different personalities. Furutaka takes her pride as a heavy cruiser seriously, while Kako is a sleepyhead.

A heavy cruiser set to appear in the upcoming movie. She is last seen observing Kitakami and Ōi sharing their moments together at the Naval Base's park much to her dismay in the official trailer.

Light cruisers (season 1)

, 

Two light cruisers assigned to the Fourth Fleet during the Battle of the Sea in Front of the Naval Base and later the Fourth Torpedo Squadron during the Battle of W island. Both of them have their own verbal tic as they speak, with Kuma often inserting "kuma" into her sentences, while Tama has "nya".

, 

Two Kuma-class cruisers rebuilt into torpedo cruisers. They are always seen together due to Kitakami being the object of obsession for Ōi, who is wary of anyone who touches or talks with Kitakami, dealing with them in a quite rude and furious attitude. They are now a part of the Fifth Mobile Fleet during Operation MO and Operation FS.
Ōi said that they are not light cruisers, and they call themselves Torpedo Cruisers.
In Truk Lagoon, Ōi is also shown to have a fear of snakes.

Another light cruiser assigned to the Second Support Fleet during the Battle of the Sea in Front of the Naval Base, who later becomes the flagship of the Fourth Torpedo Squadron during the Battle of W island.

A light cruiser who also works as a quest giver to the kanmusu. She mostly locates enemy bases from the communications room's radar and tells the fleet when an enemy has been spotted. She is also responsible for the equipment given to the kanmusu prior to their sortie.

Three light cruisers belonging to the Third Torpedo Squadron. They give Fubuki different training sessions unique to them. Sendai trains Fubuki in balancing (since Special Type Destroyers tend to randomly lose balance), Jintsū in target accuracy, and Naka in confidence (i.e. smiling and standing out in front of other kanmusu). Jintsū is the flagship of the Third Torpedo Squadron.
These three kanmusu have different characteristics. Sendai looks energetic and loves night battles. Jintsū is gentle and quiet but also responsible. Naka is always active and happy, likes singing and dancing, even identifying herself as the idol of the fleet.
Naka would later be transferred to another fleet which also consists of former Third Torpedo Squadron member Yūdachi during Operation FS.

Others (season 1)

She mostly makes sweets like parfait for the kanmusu.

The admiral of all the kanmusu, only shown through shadow or first-person view. It's assumed that the faceless and voiceless portrayal is in order to not interfere with the viewers' own vision of the admiral, as the game's admirals are the players themselves. The Admiral's gender is also ambiguous, though Crunchyroll's subtitled release refers to as a male.

Broadcast and distribution
The series is directed by Keizō Kusakawa, with the script written by Jukki Hanada, and features the voice cast from the original game. The show's premiere screening event took place at Shinjuku Piccadilly on December 27, 2014. The 12-episode series aired in Japan between January 8 and March 26, 2015 and was simulcast and licensed by Crunchyroll. The first Blu-ray and DVD compilation volumes were released on March 27, 2015. Funimation released the series in North America, on behalf of Crunchyroll. Madman Entertainment licensed the series in Australia and New Zealand.

On January 4, 2019, it was announced that a new anime television series is in production. ENGI will animate the new season, with Ultra Super Pictures handling production. The season, subtitled , is directed by Kazuya Miura, with scripts written by Kensuke Tanaka, the game's original writer, character designs handled by Chika Nomi, and music composed by Kaori Ohkoshi. It premiered on November 4, 2022, and will run for eight episodes.

Episode list

Kantai Collection: KanColle (season 1)

KanColle: Let's Meet at Sea (season 2)

Reception
The first volume of the anime ranked second place within Oricon's weekly anime Blu-ray sales charts during its first week of release, selling 16,789 units and trailing behind the limited edition Blu-ray boxset of Fate/stay night: Unlimited Blade Works; the same volume also placed third within the anime DVD sales charts, with 3,184 units sold.

Jonathan Gad of Vice said that the Kantai Collection anime television series is historically revisionist, criticising the show's depiction of the Japanese protagonists being victorious in the Battle of Midway.

References

External links
 
 

2015 anime television series debuts
Anime television series based on video games
Crunchyroll anime
Diomedéa
ENGI
Funimation
Madman Entertainment anime
Military science fiction
Moe anthropomorphism
Tokyo MX original programming
Television series about World War II alternate histories